The following is a list of clubs who have played in Ligue 1 at any time since its foundation for the 1932–33 season to the current season. A total of 73 teams have played in Ligue 1.

List
 As of end of 2021–22 season
 Clubs in bold indicate the 20 clubs participating in the 2022–23 Ligue 1 season

References

 
Association football in France lists